{{DISPLAYTITLE:Phi1 Orionis}}

Phi1 Orionis is a binary star system in the constellation Orion, positioned less than a degree to the south of Meissa. It is visible to the naked eye with an apparent visual magnitude of 4.42. The distance to this system, based upon an annual parallax shift of 3.0 mas, is around 1,090 light-years.

This is a single-lined spectroscopic binary star system with an orbital period of 3,068 days and an eccentricity of 0.22. It is a member of the young Lambda Orionis cluster and is roughly 7 million years old. The primary component is a B-type giant star with a stellar classification of B0 III. It has over 15 times the mass of the Sun and around 6.3 times the Sun's radius. Nothing is known about the secondary companion. It does not contribute a significant amount of light to the combined spectrum.

References

External links

Spectroscopic binaries
B-type giants
Orionis, Phi
Orion (constellation)
Durchmusterung objects
Orionis, 37
036822
026176
1876